Seven Days Grace is a 1969 West German crime film directed by Alfred Vohrer. It was entered into the 6th Moscow International Film Festival.

Cast
 Joachim Fuchsberger as Hendriks
 Horst Tappert as Klevenow
 Konrad Georg as Fromm
 Karin Hübner as Frau Muhl
 Petra Schürmann as Fräulein Gabert
 Hilde Brand as Lonny
 Bruno Dallansky as Herr Muhl
 Paul Albert Krumm as Stallmann
 Robert Meyn as Direktor
 Joachim Rake as Beamter
 Otto Stern as Kurrat Senior

References

External links
 

1969 films
1969 crime films
1960s mystery films
German crime films
German mystery films
West German films
1960s German-language films
Films directed by Alfred Vohrer
Films set in schools
Films set in boarding schools
Films based on German novels
Films based on mystery novels
1960s German films